Belo Monte is the name of a former cacao plantation (1922) in the northeastern part of Príncipe Island in São Tomé and Príncipe. It has been recently restored and is currently operated as a nature resort. The population of the nearby village, constructed for the plantation personnel, is 75  (2012 census). The settlement is located northeast of the island capital Santo António and Picão. The plantation grounds include Praia Banana, one of the iconic beaches of Principe

Population history

References

Populated places in the Autonomous Region of Príncipe